Huskies Stadium is a  Canadian football stadium at Saint Mary's University in Halifax, Nova Scotia, home to the Saint Mary's Huskies. 

It had a promoted capacity of 9,000 to 11,000 that is achievable via temporary seating, but the actual permanent seating is only 2,000. It was built in 1969 for the 1970 Canada Summer Games.  It has hosted many Canadian Interuniversity Sport Atlantic & Uteck Bowl national semi-final football games.

On June 11, 2005, the stadium hosted an exhibition game between the Hamilton Tiger-Cats and the Toronto Argonauts to gauge Halifax's public support for a CFL franchise. The game was called "Touchdown Atlantic". For the game, the stadium's capacity was temporarily augmented to 11,000. In July 2009, new seating was added that holds up to 500 people on the east-end of the stadium.

The main grandstand was demolished in Spring 2014. The site was used for football and track in 2014 with seating for fans on new east-side bleachers and on a new grassed area formerly occupied by the stadium grandstand. The university said at the time it will continue to examine options for a future new grandstand facility in the interim.

On July 25, 2020 the stadium was scheduled to host Touchdown Atlantic, a regular season CFL game between the Toronto Argonauts and the Saskatchewan Roughriders, but the game was ultimately rescheduled for 2022 and relocated to Wolfville, Nova Scotia due to the ongoing COVID-19 pandemic.

References

External links
 Saint Mary's University
 Huskies Stadium

Sports venues in Halifax, Nova Scotia
Canadian football venues
Athletics (track and field) venues in Canada
Saint Mary's University (Halifax)